Lori Bettison-Varga (born ) is an American geologist and academic administrator. She is the president of the Los Angeles Museum of Natural History. Previously, she was president of Scripps College, and held positions at Pomona College, the College of Wooster, and Whitman College.

References

American geologists
1960s births
Directors of museums in the United States
Scripps College people
Pomona College faculty
College of Wooster faculty
Whitman College faculty
Living people
Women museum directors